Hedditch is a surname. Notable people with the surname include:

 Harry Hedditch (1893–1974), Australian politician
 Mabel Emily Hedditch (1897–1966), Australian farmer and politician